Solar cycles are nearly periodic 11-year changes in the Sun's activity that are based on the number of sunspots present on the Sun's surface. The first solar cycle conventionally is said to have started in 1755 when Rudolf Wolf began extensive reporting of sunspot activity. The source data are the revised International Sunspot Numbers (ISN v2.0), as available at SILSO.
Sunspot counts exist since 1610 but the cycle numbering is not well defined during the Maunder minimum. It was proposed that one cycle might have been lost in the late 18th century, but this remains not fully confirmed.

Solar cycles can be reconstructed indirectly, using the radiocarbon 14C proxy, for the last millennium.

The smoothing is done using the traditional SIDC smoothing algorithm. Using this algorithm, if the month in question is notated month 0, a weighted average is formed of months −6 to 6, where months −5 to 5 are given weightings of 1, and months −6 and 6 are given weightings of 0.5. Other smoothing formulas exist, and they usually give slightly different values for the amplitude and timings of the solar cycles. An example is the Meeus smoothing formula, with related solar cycles characteristics available in this STCE news item.

The start of solar cycle 25 was declared by SIDC on September 15 2020 as being in December 2019. This makes cycle 24 the only "11-year solar cycle" to have lasted precisely 11 years.

Details of cycles 1 to 25

 Note: The SSN of 92.3 for August 2022 is 1% below the maximum SSN predicted by Zharkova for SC25.

Unofficial cycles starting with a maximum
The following table is instead divided into (unofficial) cycles starting and ending with a maximum, to give a better feel for the number of spotless days associated with each minimum:

Comparison of cycles 24 and 25 by 13-month Running Averages
Following is a comparison of the growth of cycle 25 versus cycle 24, using the 13-month sunspot averages, beginning with the months of the respective minimums.
Numbers in brackets for cycle 25 indicate the minimum possible value for that month, assuming there are no more sunspots between now (Mar 15 2023) and six months after the end of the month in question.
The table shows averages for each hemisphere and the average for the entire Sun.

Comparison of Cycles 24 and 25 by Daily Spots
The following table gives the number of days so far in cycle 25 against the number up to the same point in cycle 24, and also up to the end of 2012 in cycle 24, which have passed various thresholds for the numbers of sunspots.

As at Mar 15 2023, solar cycle 25 is averaging 17% more spots per day than solar cycle 24 at the same point in the cycle (Mar 15 2012).
Year 4 of solar cycle 25 (Dec 1 2022 to Mar 15 2023) is averaging 46% more spots per day than the corresponding period in solar cycle 24.

References

External links
Solar Influences Data Analysis Center (SIDC)
Graphics of historic solar cycles at the SIDC page
Near realtime solar images from SOHO
SORCE Total Solar Irradiance (TSI) Data

Periodic phenomena